The Highland Jaguars were a field hockey team that competed in the now defunct annual Great Britain Super League tournament. Whilst they had competed in most of the tournaments, they were ejected from the league for the 2008 season for team difficulties, however they returned to the league for the 2009 season. The team represents the best of Scotland, however, their partner team, Caledonian Cougars, also partake in the selection process. As a result the mixture of ability within the two teams are roughly equal.

The team for the 2009 season is as follows:
Allan Dick
Tom O'Kelly
Adam MacKenzie
Andrew Sinclair
Derek Salmon
Callum Duke
Craig Harper
Stephen Dick (C)
Graham Moodie
Fraser Hirst
Ian Moodie
Callum Milne
Daniel Coultas
Robert Barr
Fergus Dunn
Cammy Fraser
Chris Grassick
Gavin Byers
John Martin
Adam Walker
Ross Jamieson

Scottish field hockey clubs